The 1886 Colorado gubernatorial election was held on November 2, 1886. Democratic nominee Alva Adams defeated Republican nominee William H. Meyer with 49.66% of the vote.

General election

Candidates
Major party candidates
Alva Adams, Democratic
William H. Meyer, Republican

Other candidates
William H. Fishback, Prohibition

Results

References

1886
Colorado
Gubernatorial